Sand grass or sandgrass is a common name for several plants and may refer to:

Mibora
Stipa
Triplasis